Sheykhabad (also Romanized as Sheykhābād) is a village in Harazpey-ye Jonubi Rural District, in the Central District of Amol County, Mazandaran Province, Iran. At the 2006 census, its population was 263, in 65 families.

References 

Populated places in Amol County